Compañía de Aviación Faucett, colloquially known simply as Faucett Perú or Faucett, was a Peruvian airline. It was headquartered on the grounds of Jorge Chávez International Airport in Lima.

History

Elmer J. Faucett had been sent to Peru as a representative of the Curtiss Export Company, arriving in the country from the United States in 1920. In 1928, he and a group of Peruvian business men joined to found the first commercial airline in Peru, and one of the first in Latin America. With an initial investment of £2,500, the company was formed on 15 September 1928, and started operations on 27 September that year. In 1937, the airline absorbed Compañía de Aviación Peruana SA from Panagra. At , the route network was flown with seven planes manufactured by the Stinson Aircraft Company, and included Chiclayo, Ica, Lima, Sabados and Talara.

Postwar operations
Having their initial investment increased to £200,000 by 1943, Elmer Faucett bought a large number of aircraft from the United States in 1945.

Faucett carried 136,456 passengers in 1955, and at year end the company had 307 employees.

A second-hand Douglas DC-6B acquired from Panagra was incorporated into the fleet in the early 1960s. Another DC-6B was acquired in late 1964, and was converted to DC-6B(F) standard with a large rear freight door. This was operated on cargo services to Miami, Florida.

In 1973, Faucett was owned by Peruvian interests (46%), the Fundación Faucett (35%) and Braniff International Airways (19%). The cargo-only airline Aeronaves del Peru became Faucett's biggest shareholder in 1982.

At March 1990, the airline had 1,300 employees and a fleet of ten aircraft that consisted of two Boeing 727-200s, one Boeing 737-100, four Boeing 737-200s and three McDonnell Douglas DC-8-50s. One of the 727-200s disappeared off the coast of Newfoundland on 11 September 1990.

The 1990s economic liberalization under Alberto Fujimori, after years of economic and political chaos (as well as a violent Maoist insurgency), brought a series of measures aimed at the privatization and deregulation of the airline market. A series of short-lived airlines sprung up during this decade (in the style of Russian Babyflots), stated-owned Aeroperú was partly sold to Mexican investors and the rise of low-fare Aero Continente as the biggest domestic airline, contributed to the slow decline of Faucett. A series of high-profile accidents, especially Faucett's crash in Arequipa and Aeroperú Flight 603 (both in 1996) affected the safety reputation of the Peruvian airline industry, with even the US Embassy in Lima banning their employees from flying on Aero Continente and, more broadly, advising caution to US citizens flying on Peru's airlines.

In the end, problems with the economic-financial structure of the airline (with debts even with CORPAC for airport services), forced it to cease operations on 3 December 1997. Despite claiming that the 45-day closure would be temporary until government approval, all 1,250 employees were dismissed. Faucett incurred over US$1 million in debt. By 1998, the former directors and employees were engaged in legal battles over labor and management issues, as well as accusations over bankrupting the company. The airline was liquidated in 1999.

Destinations
Faucett Perú served the following destinations:

According to the February 15, 1985 edition of the Official Airline Guide (OAG), Faucett was also serving Owen Roberts International Airport on Grand Cayman in the Cayman Islands as an intermediate stop on its service between Lima and Miami.

Fleet

Faucett Perú operated the following equipment all through its history:

Incidents and accidents
 On 8 December 1967, a Faucett Douglas DC-4 airliner crashed into a mountain in the Andes at 10,470 feet, killing all 66 passengers and six crew.
 On 11 September 1990, a Faucett Boeing 727-247 went missing some 180 miles southeast of Cape Race, Newfoundland. After having been leased to Air Malta, the aircraft was being returned to Peru from Europe via Iceland, when the crew reported a low fuel notice and that they were preparing to ditch. There were apparently no survivors among 16 occupants on board.
 On 29 February 1996, Faucett Perú Flight 251, a Boeing 737 crashed in the mountains near Arequipa's airport, killing all 117 passengers and 6 crew aboard.

See also

List of airlines of Peru
Transport in Peru

References

External links

 Aircraft and Code data

 
Defunct airlines of Peru
Airlines established in 1928
Airlines disestablished in 1997
1928 establishments in Peru
1997 disestablishments in Peru